Arūnas Degutis (born 26 July 1958, in Kaunas) is a Lithuanian politician who was a signatory of the Act of the Re-Establishment of the State of Lithuania.

References

External links 
Official website

1958 births
Living people
Politicians from Kaunas
Members of the Seimas
Labour Party (Lithuania) MEPs
MEPs for Lithuania 2004–2009
Signatories of the Act of the Re-Establishment of the State of Lithuania